The following lists events that happened during 1855 in New Zealand.

Population
The estimated population of New Zealand at the end of 1855 is 59,500 Māori and 37,192 non-Māori.

Incumbents

Regal and viceregal
Head of State – Queen Victoria
Governor – Colonel Thomas Gore Browne, appointed in 1854, arrives to take up his position on 6 September.

Government and law
The 1st Parliament is dissolved on 15 September in preparation for the 1855 general election. The election starts on 26 October and concludes on 28 December. The 2nd Parliament is not formed until 15 April 1856.

There is neither an official Prime minister/Premier/Colonial Secretary or Finance Minister/Colonial Secretary in the government at this point in time. (see 1st New Zealand Parliament)

Speaker of the House — Sir Charles Clifford
Chief Justice — William Martin

Events
 January:  The Māori language magazine, The Maori Messenger or Te Karere Maori resumes publication with a change to the Māori title. It stopped publication the previous year. Under this name, it continues until 1861.
 23 January: The 1855 Wairarapa earthquake causes extensive damage but few deaths. The quake, estimated at magnitude 8.2, raises parts of the Wellington harbour foreshore by as much as 6 metres.
 April: James McKenzie is found guilty of stealing 1000 sheep and sentenced to five years hard labour in Lyttelton. He is pardoned the following year.
 July: New Zealand's first postage stamps are issued.

Sport

Horse racing
The Canterbury Jockey Club holds its first meeting, at Riccarton Racecourse, including the Canterbury Cup (which is run in heats).

Births
 23 April: Walter Carncross, politician.

Deaths

 26 June: Samuel Stephens, member of the New Zealand House of Representatives
 21 August: William Hulme, British army officer
 17 September: Alfred Christopher Picard, member of the New Zealand House of Representatives
 24 September: Ruawahine Irihapeti Faulkner, tribal leader and landowner
 18 November: Te Rangihaeata, tribal leader
 6 December: William John Swainson, ornithologist, malacologist, conchologist, entomologist and artist
 12 December: Anne Maria Chapman, missionary

See also
History of New Zealand
List of years in New Zealand
Military history of New Zealand
Timeline of New Zealand history
Timeline of New Zealand's links with Antarctica
Timeline of the New Zealand environment

References